Milton Josephs (24 September 1931 – 4 June 1995) was a Jamaican cricketer. He played in three first-class matches for the Jamaican cricket team from 1959 to 1962.

See also
 List of Jamaican representative cricketers

References

External links
 

1931 births
1995 deaths
Jamaican cricketers
Jamaica cricketers
Sportspeople from Kingston, Jamaica